The 2001 WAC men's basketball tournament was held in the Reynolds Center in Tulsa, Oklahoma.  The winners of the tournament were the #5 seeded Hawaii.

Bracket 

* - denotes overtime period

References

WAC men's basketball tournament
Tournament
WAC men's basketball tournament